The Park Site, designated 36LA96, is a historic archaeological site located in West Lampeter Township, Lancaster County, Pennsylvania, just south of the city of Lancaster. The site was excavated and assessed in 1979.  The site features a Susquehannock burial site dated to the early 18th century and European-made artifacts.

In 1985, it was listed on the National Register of Historic Places as "Park Site 36La96".  A plaque is posted on the site, and several artifacts are displayed at the park's Environmental Center.

References

Archaeological sites on the National Register of Historic Places in Pennsylvania
Archaeological sites in Lancaster County, Pennsylvania
Susquehannock
National Register of Historic Places in Lancaster County, Pennsylvania